Francisco Javier López Alfaro (born 1 November 1962), known simply as Francisco as a player, is a Spanish retired football central midfielder and manager.

Club career
Francisco was born in Osuna, Province of Seville, Andalusia. During his career he represented Sevilla FC, his hometown club, and RCD Espanyol, appearing in 436 La Liga matches. He finished his first season in the competition with 20 games – all starts – and one goal, helping the former to finish seventh.

In the 1992–93 campaign, Francisco experienced top-flight relegation with the Catalans, but achieved promotion the following year always as an important player. He retired at the end of 1996–97, aged nearly 35.

López began working as a manager with Espanyol's youth sides, then proceeded to coach Coria CF, Real Jaén, CF Extremadura, UE Figueres and top-tier CD Numancia. He was dismissed after ten rounds in the 2004–05 season, as the latter were eventually relegated. In July 2006, he joined Segunda División B team CF Badalona.

Midway through the 2008–09 campaign, López was sacked as manager of CD Atlético Baleares, also in division three. Subsequently, he was appointed at Sevilla FC C in the Tercera División.

International career
Francisco earned 20 caps and scored one goal for Spain, and was selected for both the UEFA Euro 1984 and the 1986 FIFA World Cup tournaments. His debut came on 27 October 1982, in a 1–0 win against Iceland in the Euro 1984 qualifiers.

International goals

Honours

Player
Espanyol
Segunda División: 1993–94

See also
List of La Liga players (400+ appearances)

References

External links

 (1st part)
 (2nd part)

1962 births
Living people
People from Osuna
Sportspeople from the Province of Seville
Spanish footballers
Footballers from Andalusia
Association football midfielders
La Liga players
Segunda División players
Segunda División B players
Sevilla Atlético players
Sevilla FC players
RCD Espanyol footballers
Spain youth international footballers
Spain under-21 international footballers
Spain amateur international footballers
Spain international footballers
UEFA Euro 1984 players
1986 FIFA World Cup players
Spanish football managers
La Liga managers
Segunda División managers
Segunda División B managers
Tercera División managers
Real Jaén managers
CF Extremadura managers
UE Figueres managers
CD Numancia managers
CF Badalona managers
CD Atlético Baleares managers